Gardiner's burrowing skink (Pamelaescincus gardineri) is a species of lizard in the family Scincidae. P. gardineri is the only species in the (monotypic) skink genus Pamelaescincus.

Etymology 
The generic name, Pamelaescincus, is in honor of Pamela, the older of Allen E. Greer's two sisters.

The specific name, gardineri, is in honor of British zoologist John Stanley Gardiner.

Taxonomy 
P. gardineri is usually placed in the subfamily Scincinae, which seems to be paraphyletic. Probably quite close to Janetaescincus, it belongs to a major clade that does not seem to include the type genus Scincus. Thus, it will probably be eventually assigned to a new, yet-to-be-named subfamily.

Geographic range 
P. gardineri is found only in the Seychelles.

Habitat and behavior 
The natural habitats of P. gardineri are subtropical or tropical dry forests and subtropical or tropical moist lowland forests, where it burrows in the leaf litter and soil.

Conservation status 
Populations of P. gardeneri are locally affected by introduced predators and habitat destruction, but unlike its relatives, it is not considered an endangered species by the IUCN.

References

External links 
 Monitoring and conservation of Seychelles reptiles and amphibians
 Pamelaescincus gardineri, Reptile Database

Skinks
Reptiles described in 1909
Taxa named by George Albert Boulenger
Endemic fauna of Seychelles
Taxonomy articles created by Polbot